This is a list of flags used in the Philippines.

National flag

Governmental flags

Military flags

Philippine coast guard flags

Civil flags

Historical national flags

2016-2017 Flag https://commons.wikimedia.org/wiki/File:Philippine_Flag_with_4_stars_and_9_rays.svg

Regional flags
Among the country's 17 regions, only the Bangsamoro Autonomous Region in Muslim Mindanao has its own officially legislated regional flag. The purported flag of the Cordillera Administrative Region — which has no elected regional government that could legally specify the details of the reported emblem — has not been attested.

Provincial flags

Municipal and city flags 

Like the flags of most Philippine provinces, flags of cities and municipalities usually just bear the seal of the municipality or city on a single or multi colored field, but there are some municipal or city flags that differ from the standard. All municipalities in the province of Camarines Norte and Aklan bear flags that differ from the standard.

Other historical flags

Political flags

Flag proposals

See also
 Flag of the Philippines
 Coat of Arms of the Philippines
 Flags of the Philippine provinces
 Flags of the Philippine Revolution
 Evolution of the Philippine Flag

Notes

References 

Flags of the Philippines
Lists and galleries of flags
Flags
National symbols of the Philippines